Brock is an unincorporated community in Scotland County, in the U.S. state of Missouri.

History
A post office called Brock was established in 1889, and remained in operation until 1904. The community has the name of William J. Brock, a state legislator.

References

Unincorporated communities in Scotland County, Missouri
Unincorporated communities in Missouri